Volodymyr Bohdanovych Mykytyn (born 28 April 1970) is a Ukrainian professional football coach and a former player. He is a manager of Metalurh Zaporizhzhia since August 2020.

Club career
Mykytyn started to play football at a local sports school in Krasnyi Luch in 1979, later he played for the Voroshilovgrad boarding school of sports specialization (Shkola Internat Sportifnogo Profilia) in Luhansk.

He made his professional debut at age 17 playing in the 1987 Soviet Second League for FC Stakhanovets Stakhanov. In 1989–1990 Mykytyn also played for the Second League team of the Odessa Military District SKA Odessa.

His debut at continental club competitions Mykytyn made for FC Shakhtar Donetsk when on 10 August 1999 he came out on substitution in home game against the Macedonian side Sileks Kratovo during the 1999–2000 UEFA Cup.

In 2004 return to Luhansk after few years playing in neighboring Russia for FC Rostov. In Luhansk Mykytyn retired from playing career in 2006 and become a coach within FC Zorya Luhansk youth system. Due to the Russian aggression against Ukraine, in 2014 along with the club was forced to relocate to Zaporizhia.

International career
Mykytyn made his international debut for Ukraine on 15 July 1998 in a home friendly game against Poland which Ukraine lost 1:2. In total he played 13 international games scoring no goals during 1998–1999 in friendly games and qualification games to the UEFA Euro 2000.

During that period he changed from FC Karpaty Lviv to FC Shakhtar Donetsk.

Coaching career
His coaching career Mykytyn started in 2006 with the FC Zorya Luhansk youth system and in 2007–2020 he was a senior coach of Zorya reserves and under-21 team.

In August 2020 Mykytyn accepted his first managerial post in FC Metalurh Zaporizhia as since 2014 Zorya is quartered in Zaporizhia, due to the Russian aggression against Ukraine.

Honours
 Russian Cup finalist: 2003.

References

1970 births
Living people
People from Krasnyi Luch
Ukrainian footballers
Ukrainian expatriate footballers
Ukraine international footballers
Ukrainian Premier League players
Russian Premier League players
Ukrainian football managers
FC Shakhtar Stakhanov players
SKA Odesa players
FC Zorya Luhansk players
FC Karpaty Lviv players
FC Karpaty-2 Lviv players
FC Shakhtar Donetsk players
FC Shakhtar-2 Donetsk players
FC Vorskla Poltava players
FC Rostov players
Expatriate footballers in Russia
Association football midfielders
Association football defenders
FC Metalurh Zaporizhzhia managers
Sportspeople from Luhansk Oblast